Anti-bolshevism may refer to:
 Council communism, a current of socialist thought
 Anti-communism, opposition to communism
 Anti-Leninism, opposition to the political philosophy of Vladimir Lenin
 Anti-Stalinist left, a leftist current opposed to the political philosophy of Joseph Stalin
 Anti-Sovietism, opposition to the government of the Soviet Union